The Church of St Andrew in Clevedon, Somerset, England. Parts of the original 12th-century church remain with 14th- and 15th-century additions. It is on a hill overlooking the Bristol Channel, and has been designated as a Grade I listed building.

The church was built on Anglo-Saxon foundations.

It is the burial place of Arthur Hallam, subject of the poem In Memoriam A.H.H. by his friend Alfred, Lord Tennyson. The exterior of the church includes a carving which may be a Sheela na gig. The Anglican parish of Clevedon is part of the Portishead deanery.

St Andrew's was used as a filming location to depict the local parish church in all three series of the popular crime drama Broadchurch.

See also
 List of ecclesiastical parishes in the Diocese of Bath and Wells

References

External links
Church website

13th-century church buildings in England
Church of England church buildings in North Somerset
Grade I listed churches in Somerset
Buildings and structures in Clevedon
Grade I listed buildings in North Somerset
Broadchurch